Isaías Violante Romero (born 20 October 2003) is a Mexican professional footballer who plays as a winger for Liga MX club Toluca.

International career
Violante was part of the under-20 squad that competed at the 2021 Revelations Cup, where Mexico won the competition. In June 2022, he was named into the final 20-man roster for the CONCACAF Under-20 Championship, in which Mexico failed to qualify for the FIFA U-20 World Cup and Olympics.

Career statistics

Club

Honours
Mexico U20
Revelations Cup: 2021, 2022

References

External links
 

2003 births
Living people
Mexican footballers
Mexico youth international footballers
Association football forwards
Liga MX players
Deportivo Toluca F.C. players
Footballers from Veracruz
Sportspeople from Veracruz
Mexico under-20 international footballers